Joseph Owusu Tabiri (born 16 October 1988) is a Ghana-born English footballer who plays as a midfielder for Linero IF.

Career
Tabiri joined Farnborough on dual registration in January 2008, having previously played for Staines Town and Wingate & Finchley.

He made his Barnet debut in the League Cup against Brighton & Hove Albion on 13 August 2008. In October 2008 he joined Lewes on loan, and was sent off on his debut.

Tabiri signed for Grays Athletic on a one-month loan deal in January 2009, before joining Havant & Waterlooville in November for a month, and again for a month in February. He joined Dover Athletic on loan in March. Tabiri was released by Barnet at the end of the 2009/10 season, before joining Dover Athletic on a one-year deal.

In November 2012, he joined Conference South side AFC Hornchurch on a free transfer.

References

External links

Barnet Profile

1988 births
Footballers from Greater London
Living people
Association football midfielders
Ghanaian footballers
English footballers
Barnet F.C. players
Staines Town F.C. players
Farnborough F.C. players
Lewes F.C. players
Welwyn Garden City F.C. players
Grays Athletic F.C. players
Havant & Waterlooville F.C. players
Dover Athletic F.C. players
Wingate & Finchley F.C. players
Hornchurch F.C. players
Maidenhead United F.C. players
Cheshunt F.C. players
Aveley F.C. players
Bishop's Stortford F.C. players
Cambridge City F.C. players
English Football League players
National League (English football) players
Isthmian League players
Expatriate footballers in Sweden
Torns IF players